Combretum constrictum is a flowering tree species endemic to tropical Africa, within Afrotropic ecoregions.

Countries it is native to include: Kenya; Tanzania, Somalia, Mozambique, and Nigeria.

References

constrictum
Trees of Africa
Flora of East Tropical Africa
Flora of Northeast Tropical Africa
Flora of South Tropical Africa
Flora of West Tropical Africa
Afrotropical realm flora
Flora of Kenya
Flora of Tanzania
Flora of Somalia
Flora of Mozambique
Flora of Nigeria
Taxa named by George Bentham